Pune Cantonment Board is the administrative body for the region of Camp Cantonment in the city of Pune, India. It was established in the year 1817. This cantonment is a Class I Cantonment as per the Cantonments Act, 2006 by the Government of India.

References

Government of Pune
1817 establishments in India